The 1958–59 NCAA men's ice hockey season began in November 1958 and concluded with the 1959 NCAA Men's Ice Hockey Tournament's championship game on March 14, 1959 at the RPI Field House in Troy, New York. This was the 12th season in which an NCAA ice hockey championship was held and is the 65th year overall where an NCAA school fielded a team.

After the previous season the WIHL dissolved due to an argument between member universities over recruiting practices, namely the tendency of Colorado College, Denver and North Dakota to recruit overage Canadian players. In time the practice would eventually lead to Denver's appearance in the 1973 tournament being vacated but rules prohibiting such recruits did not exist at the time. Due to the dissolution of the WIHL the three schools belonging to the Big Ten Conference formed their own ice hockey division.

Regular season

Season tournaments

Standings

1959 NCAA Tournament

Note: * denotes overtime period(s)

Player stats

Scoring leaders
The following players led the league in points at the conclusion of the season.

GP = Games played; G = Goals; A = Assists; Pts = Points; PIM = Penalty minutes

Leading goaltenders
The following goaltenders led the league in goals against average at the end of the regular season while playing at least 33% of their team's total minutes.

GP = Games played; Min = Minutes played; W = Wins; L = Losses; OT = Overtime/shootout losses; GA = Goals against; SO = Shutouts; SV% = Save percentage; GAA = Goals against average

Awards

NCAA

References

External links
College Hockey Historical Archives
1958–59 NCAA Standings

 
NCAA